Mparo is a town in the Western Region of Uganda and the political and administrative center of Rukiga District. However, the largest town in the district and its major commercial center is Muhanga.

Location
Mparo is located in Mparo Parish, Rwamucuucu sub-county, in Rukiga District, on the west bank of Kanyabaha River, immediately west of the urban center of Rwakahinda. The approximate geographical coordinates of Mparo, Rukiga District are: 01°11'04.0"S, 30°03'16.0"E (Latitude:-1.184444; Longitude:30.054444).

Overview
Mparo is the location of the headquarters of Rukiga District, which became operational on 1 July 2017.

See also

References

Rukiga District
Kigezi sub-region
Populated places in Western Region, Uganda
Cities in the Great Rift Valley